Virenia "Nia" Peeples (born December 10, 1961) is an American R&B and dance music singer and actress. Peeples is known for playing Nicole Chapman on the hit TV series Fame; Pam Fields on the drama Pretty Little Liars; Karen Taylor Winters on The Young and the Restless and Sydney Cooke on Walker, Texas Ranger. Her most recent television role was Grace's mom, Susan, on The Fosters.

Early life
Peeples was born December 10, 1961, in Hollywood, California, the daughter of Elizabeth Joan (née Rubic), a flamenco dancer, and Robert Eugene Peeples. She was raised in West Covina. Her maternal grandparents were immigrants from the Philippines. Her father, who was originally from Mississippi, was of Scottish, English, and Irish ancestry. Peeples attended UCLA during which time she performed as Liberace's opening act in Las Vegas on weekends.

Personal life

Peeples lives in Malibu, California, and has one son Christopher (b. 1989 with ex-husband Howard Hewett) and one daughter with her former husband, Lauro Chartrand.

She operates an internet based organization called Elements of Life, which promotes fitness, inspiration, healthy lifestyle changes and emotional well-being. She worked with business coach Amy Applebaum on its development.

On August 11, 2015, Peeples filed for divorce from her surfer husband Sam George. Peeples filed in Los Angeles County, 20 days before the couple's eighth wedding anniversary. Peeples is seeking to keep the couple's home, a Malibu manufactured home with an ocean view that's valued at $875,000. Also listed among the couple's community assets is a Las Vegas condo worth $91,000.

Career

Music
Peeples started her career as part of the performance group The Young Americans. In 1988 she hit #1 on the Hot Dance Music/Club Play chart with "Trouble", which climbed to #35 on the Billboard Hot 100. Her most successful pop single is "Street Of Dreams", which hit #12 on the Billboard Hot 100 in 1991. She made a music video in 1986 for "All You Can Dream", directed by Alan Bloom and conceptualized by Keith Williams, for the purposes of promoting the values of UCLA. On February 4, 2009, Peeples presented Debbie Allen with a Lifetime Achievement Award at The Carnival: Choreographer's Ball 10th anniversary show. Peeples also attends and performs at the annual live Fame Reunion concerts overseas.

Acting
Notably, Peeples portrayed performing arts student Nicole Chapman on the hit TV series Fame. In 1987, she was in the movie North Shore as Kiani. She also hosted the short-lived American version of Top of the Pops in 1987, a weeknight dance music program called The Party Machine with Nia Peeples (1991), and portrayed Texas Ranger Sydney Cooke in the CBS hit series Walker, Texas Ranger from 1999 to 2001. In 2004, she appeared in the Andromeda episode "The Spider's Stratagem", as arms smuggler and love-interest Rox Nava. Peeples joined the cast of The Young and the Restless in 2007, playing the role of Karen Taylor, and was released from the role in the spring of 2009. In 2010, she was cast in ABC Family's TV series Pretty Little Liars, based on the book series by Sara Shepard. Peeples was featured on the July 7, 2013 episode of Celebrity Wife Swap, in which she traded places with singer Tiffany.

Discography

Albums
Nothin' But Trouble (1988) – US #97
Nia Peeples (1991)
Songs of the Cinema (2007)

Singles

Filmography

Film

Television

See also
List of artists who reached number one on the US Dance chart
List of number-one dance hits (United States)

References

External links
 
 
 
 

20th-century American singers
21st-century American singers
21st-century American actresses
20th-century American actresses
American television actresses
American film actresses
American dance musicians
American soap opera actresses
Living people
Actresses from Hollywood, Los Angeles
American actresses of Filipino descent
American people of Scottish descent
American people of English descent
American people of Irish descent
20th-century American women singers
21st-century American women singers
People from West Covina, California
The Young Americans members
1961 births